Chandrakanta Santati is an epic fantasy adventure Hindi novel by Devaki Nandan Khatri. Published in 6 Volumes, it serves as the sequel to Chandrakanta, the first modern Hindi novel which was released in 1888.

The phenomenal success of Chandrakanta prompted Devaki Nandan Khatri to write a 24-part sequel (which was further divided into 295-chapters or bayaans) titled Chandrakanta Santati (Chandrakanta's Progeny).

The novel primarily revolves around a mechanized labyrinth called "Tilism Of Jamania" prophesied to be broken by Chandrakanta's son Indrajeet Singh & Anand Singh with the help of a book called Rakt-Granth. The novel has various characters from Chandrakanta along with introducing a plethora of new characters.

Contents 
Volume I

Volume II

Volume III

Volume IV

Volume V

Volume VI

Adaptations 

 Kahani Chandrakanta Ki is a TV adaptation of the novel  which was broadcast in 2011 on Sahara One, by director Sunil Agnihotri. The story was very different from the novel. Many actors from the 1994 TV Series reprised their role in the sequel series.
 Pawan Comics published a 12-part comic-book series based on the novel back in the 1990s.
 The novel was adapted as audiobook by the Swedish book publishing company Storytel in 2017. It is voiced by Vijay Vikram Singh, the voice of Bigg Boss, the popular Indian reality TV show.
The entire novel consisting of 294-bayaans are narrated by Sameer Goswami which is available on YouTube.

Sequel 
This was followed by Bhootnath, a novel that detailed the exploits of an aiyar of the same name who had figured prominently in his earlier novels. He had modelled it on Chandrakanta Santati but could finish only 6-parts before his untimely death on August 1, 1913. His son Durga Prasad Khatri, who himself earned fame as a writer on account of his novels Raktamandir and Mrityukiran, finished the novel and wrote the next 15-parts.

References 

Epic novels
Hindi